Robert "Honey" Williams is an American former college basketball player. He played at Grambling State University from 1977 to 1981 and was named the Southwestern Athletic Conference's co-Player of the Year as a senior in 1980–81. Williams was selected to the All-SWAC First Team as a senior and to the Second Team as a junior. He finished his career with 1,876 points and 1,002 rebounds.

After his collegiate career, Williams was selected in the 1981 NBA draft by the Washington Bullets in the sixth round (125th overall). He was waived before appearing in a regular season game.

References

Living people
Year of birth missing (living people)
American men's basketball players
Grambling State Tigers men's basketball players
Power forwards (basketball)
Washington Bullets draft picks